A Day Out of Time is a live album by Trance Mission, released on April 6, 1999, through City of Tribes Records.

Track listing

Personnel 
Trance Mission
Beth Custer – clarinets, trumpet, melodica, ocarina, shaker, tingsha, voice
Stephen Kent – didgeridoo, cello, ngoma, percussion, voice
Eda Maxym – kalimba, keyboards, shaker, voice
Peter Valsamis – drums, djembe, dumbek, gong, percussion
Production and additional personnel
Anne Hamersky – photography
Mark Stichman – engineering
Simon Tassano – production, mixing
Trance Mission – production

References

External links 
 

1999 live albums
Trance Mission albums
Music of the San Francisco Bay Area